Keith Patrick Gill (born 1986) is an American financial analyst and investor known for his posts on the subreddit r/wallstreetbets. His analyses of GameStop stock, and details of his resulting investment gains—posted on Reddit under the username DeepFuckingValue (DFV) and on YouTube and Twitter as Roaring Kitty—were cited as a driving factor in the GameStop short squeeze of January 2021, and as a spark for the subsequent trading frenzy in retail stocks. The rising stock value allowed Gill to turn a  investment into one worth close to $50 million (

Gill's posts were described as "forthright, spreadsheet-laden content". His Reddit username derives from the investing term deep value, as Gill claims to be a proponent of value investing. Reuters revealed his identity to the public on January 28, 2021, after an investigation of public records and social-media posts.

Gill gave testimony as part of a virtual hearing held by the US House Financial Services Committee on February 18, 2021 as part of a discussion about when "short sellers, social media, and retail investors collide". Gill testified he "did not solicit anyone to buy or sell the stock for [his] own profit."

Personal life 
Keith Gill was born on June 8, 1986, to Steven and Elaine Gill, and was raised in Brockton, Massachusetts. He had two siblings; his sister died in 2020. He graduated from Stonehill College in 2009 and holds several school records in track and field. Gill was named the indoor athlete of the year in 2008 by the US Track & Field and Cross Country Coaches Association after he won the 1,000-meter race at the New England Championships with a time of 2:24.73, and recorded a personal best time of 4:03 in the mile that year. He married his wife, Caroline, in 2016; they have one child.

Professional life 
Gill is a Chartered Financial Analyst (CFA) charterholder. He was a licensed securities broker registered with the Financial Industry Regulatory Authority (FINRA) from July 2012 with no disclosed regulatory infractions. As of February 26, 2021, Gill was no longer a registered financial broker; January 28 was his last day of employment with MassMutual and a FINRA spokeswoman said, "a person’s registration is terminated when he or she is no longer employed by a registered firm." Between 2010 and 2014 he worked for a family friend at a start-up in New Hampshire, working on a software program to help investors analyze stocks. He worked for LexShares until March 2017. Gill was employed at MassMutual from April 2019 until his resignation on January 28, 2021.

Position on GameStop 

In September 2019, Gill, under the username "u/DeepFuckingValue", posted on the subreddit r/wallstreetbets a screenshot of a trade consisting of a roughly $53,000 long position in GameStop; Gill's Reddit posts and YouTube videos argued (through both fundamental and technical analysis) that the stock was undervalued. The position was 50,000 shares and 500 call options. In a YouTube video, he noted that his argument did not constitute financial advice, saying "I don't provide personal investment advice or stock recommendations during the stream."

Nonetheless, his argument "helped attract a flood of retail cash into GameStop". During the first days of the valuation spike in late January 2021, hundreds of thousands of people downloaded investment apps like Robinhood to "join the action". Ultimately, Gill's investment in the stock of GameStop (which began in June 2019, when the stock was $5 per share) inspired other posters and readers to invest.

Subsequent investment in the stock (and other "meme stocks" such as AMC, BlackBerry, and Nokia) would result in controversy; the 2021 GameStop short squeeze would result in several hedge funds and other institutional investors experiencing significant financial difficulty, as well as many retail investors (and other institutional investors) seeing significant gains. By January 27, according to screenshots he posted on Reddit, Gill's original investment was worth nearly $48 million. However, the value of the stock continued to fluctuate wildly; he lost $15 million in one day, and when markets closed on January 29, The Wall Street Journal confirmed that his brokerage accounts held $33 million. In an interview with The Wall Street Journal, Gill said he "wasn't a rabble-rouser out to take on the establishment, just someone who believes investors can find value in unloved stocks".

After a two week break from posting regular updates on his position, Gill posted a new screenshot to r/wallstreetbets on February 19, 2021, showing that he had doubled the number of shares of GameStop he held (raising the total to 100,000). On April 16, 2021, he exercised all of his 500 call options with a strike price of $12, which were to expire that same day, and purchased an additional 50,000 shares, increasing his ownership to 200,000 GameStop shares.

Regulatory issues 

On February 4, 2021, it was announced that William Galvin, the Massachusetts Secretary of the Commonwealth, wrote to Gill's previous employer MassMutual to investigate whether or not Gill or the company broke any rules related to his activities in promoting the GameStop stock. A week earlier, Galvin had called for a 30-day suspension of trading in GameStop securities and insisted that the share price was "irrational." Gill testified to the House Financial Services Committee on February 18, 2021, saying: "I did not solicit anyone to buy or sell the stock for my own profit", and "I like the stock." 
In September 2021, MassMutual was fined $4 million by Massachusetts regulators for failing to supervise Gill's trading and online activity. The consent order entered by Secretary Galvin’s office against MassMutual alleged that Gill had executed approximately 1,700 trades on behalf of three other individuals, and appeared intended to suggest that Gill had engaged in manipulation of GameStop’s share price. However, an attorney for Gill said that those trades were executed for "three family members" and that "[l]ess than 5 percent of the trades in those accounts were in GME"—raising speculation that Secretary Galvin’s office had selectively omitted detail of Gill’s conduct to fit a narrative consistent with the statements he had made in January. 
In October 2021, the Securities and Exchange Commission released a 45-page report that acknowledged that "People may disagree about the prospects of GameStop and the other meme stocks" and did not indicate that any market manipulation had occurred.

References

External links 
 Keith Gill on Reddit
 
 
 Committee Hearing
 , US House Committee on Financial Services hearing
 

1986 births
21st-century American people
American financial analysts
American YouTubers
CFA charterholders
Living people
People from Brockton, Massachusetts
Reddit people
Stonehill College alumni